Ogden is an unincorporated community in York County, South Carolina, United States, located along South Carolina Highway 324, southwest of Rock Hill. The elevation of Ogden is 532 feet.

References

Unincorporated communities in York County, South Carolina
Unincorporated communities in South Carolina